Terry Lynn Karl (born November 21, 1947) is the Gildred Professor of Latin American Studies and Professor of Political Science specializing in comparative politics in the Political Science Department at Stanford University.

Early life and academics
Karl was born in St. Louis, Missouri. Karl's parents, Irene E. Karl (1915-2006; the first woman to earn a doctorate in biochemistry from the University of Wisconsin and the first female scientist to receive the Jewish Federation of St. Louis Woman of Valor Award) and Michael M. Karl (1915-2006), married in 1940 and were both professors of medicine at Washington University School of Medicine in St. Louis. She has a sister, Bonnie Karl Staffier. She has lived in Noe Valley, San Francisco, California, since 1986.

Karl attended the John Burroughs School in Ladue, Missouri, graduating in 1966. She received a B.A. from Stanford University (1970), an M.A. from Stanford University in political science (1976), and a Ph.D. with Special Distinction from Stanford University in political science (1982). Karl was granted a Doctor of Humane Letters, honoris causa, from the University of San Francisco in 2005.

Academia
Karl was an assistant professor, in the Department of Government, at Harvard University from 1982 to 1985. During that time she brought a sexual harassment complaint against Harvard Professor Jorge I. Domínguez, the senior Latin American scholar in the Department of Government. In 1983, Domínguez was officially disciplined by Harvard's administration for "serious conduct" for sexually harassing her. In February 2021 Harvard formally apologized to Karl for failing to adequately enforce sanctions against Domínguez in her sexual harassment complaint against him.

Karl served as director of Stanford's Center for Latin American Studies from 1990 to 2002. Karl is the Gildred Professor of Latin American Studies and Professor of Political Science in the Political Science Department at Stanford University.

She won the Dean's Award for Excellence in Teaching (1989), the Allan V. Cox Medal for Faculty Excellence Fostering Undergraduate Research (1994), the Walter J. Gores Award for Excellence in Graduate and Undergraduate Teaching (1997; the university's highest academic prize), and was given the Rio Branco Prize by Brazil President Fernando Henrique Cardoso in recognition of her service in fostering academic relations between the United States and Latin America.

Scholarship
She is the author of The Paradox of Plenty: Oil Booms and Petro-States (University of California Press, 1998). It was named one of the two best books on Latin America by the Latin American Studies Association. She also co-authored Limits of Competition (MIT Press, 1996; which won the Twelve Stars Environmental Prize from the European Community), co-authored with Ian Gary The Bottom of the Barrel: Africa's Oil Boom and the Poor (2004), is co-author with Mary Kaldor and Yahia Said of the forthcoming New and Old Oil Wars, and is co-author with Joseph Stiglitz, Jeffrey Sachs, and others of the forthcoming Overcoming the Resource Curse.  Her writings have been translated into 15 languages.

Selected publications

Schmitter, P. C., & Karl, T. L. (1991). What democracy is... and is not. Journal of Democracy, 2(3), 75–88.
Karl, T. L. (1990). Dilemmas of democratization in Latin America. Comparative Politics, 23(1), 1–21.
Karl, T. L., & Schmitter, P. C. (1991). Modes of transition in Latin America, southern and eastern Europe. International Social Science Journal, 128(2), 267–282.
Karl, T. L. (1995). The hybrid regimes of Central America. Journal of Democracy, 6(3), 72–86.
Karl, T. L. (1997 ). The paradox of plenty: Oil booms and petro-states. Oakland, CA: University of California Press.

References

External links 
 Terry L. Karl's web page at Stanford University.

Living people
Stanford University alumni
Harvard University faculty
Stanford University faculty
Political science educators
People from St. Louis
People from San Francisco
1947 births
Sexual harassment in the United States